Victor Ambrus   (born László Győző Ambrus, 19 August 1935 – 10 February 2021) was a Hungarian-born British illustrator of history, folk tales, and animal story books. He also became known from his appearances on the Channel 4 television archaeology series Time Team, on which he visualised how sites under excavation may have once looked. Ambrus was an Associate of the Royal College of Art and a Fellow of both the Royal Society of Arts and the Royal Society of Painters, Etchers and Engravers. He was also a patron of the Association of Archaeological Illustrators and Surveyors up until its merger with the Institute for Archaeologists in 2011.

Early life and studies

Ambrus was born on 19 August 1935 in Budapest, Hungary. He continued to live in the capital, but spent many childhood holidays in the country, where he learnt to draw horses. As he grew older he became an admirer of the illustrators Mihály Zichy, E. H. Shepard, Joyce Lankester Brisley, and the large historical paintings which he saw in public galleries. He received his secondary education at the St Imre Cistercian College, Budapest (1945–1953), before going on to study at the Hungarian Academy of Fine Arts for three years (1953–56), where he was given a thorough grounding in drawing, anatomy and print-making. His four-year course was interrupted by the unsuccessful 1956 Hungarian Revolution against the Soviet-backed government, during which a building that he and his fellow students held came under fire from the Soviets.

In December 1956 he and many other students fled, first to Austria, then to Britain, where he hoped to study in the tradition of illustrators such as E. H. Shepard, John Tenniel and Arthur Rackham. From Blackbushe Airport and Crookham army camp, speaking no English, Ambrus presented himself at Farnham Art School, and was taken on, not to follow any particular course but to work at his drawing. Ambrus had already concentrated largely on engraving and lithography which, as he says, was an excellent training for line illustration. After two terms his tutor and the Principal of Farnham School, recognising that Victor was ready for a higher level of study, commended him to the Royal College of Art in London. Ambrus won a Gulbenkian scholarship to study printmaking and illustration there for three years (1957–60).

Career in art
Ambrus had had one book published in 1955 before he left Hungary; but in Britain his career as a book illustrator began during his final year at the Royal College, when he was commissioned by the publishers, Blackie, to illustrate A. C. Jenkins's White Horses And Black Bulls. While at college he took some samples of his work to Mabel George of the Oxford University Press. In his last year of the course, he was commissioned to illustrate a book that was reviewed in the Times Literary Supplement.

His first real job on leaving college was to work for an advertising agency. As his freelance work increased after two years he went back to Farnham and started teaching at the Art School while doing illustration part-time. He lectured from 1963 to 1985 at Farnham, Guildford and Epsom Colleges of Art. He had a long career working for the Oxford University Press. Like many illustrators, Ambrus started by doing line illustrations for novels. The children's editor at OUP, Mabel George, gave him first Hester Burton's and then K M Peyton's novels to illustrate. Both used his talent for drawing horses and with both he built up a happy working relationship. He has contributed to almost 300 books. Among his credits are illustrating several fairy tale compilations by Ruth Manning-Sanders, including The Glass Man and the Golden Bird: Hungarian Folk and Fairy Tales and Jonnikin and the Flying Basket: French Folk and Fairy Tales.

He worked as the artist on the television series about archaeology, Time Team. The director and producer of the series, finding  'The Story of Britain' in Reader’s Digest, had decided that Ambrus could illustrate all the subjects they were likely to present, and invited him to take part in a pilot episode of what became Time Team on Channel 4. He designed six sets of historical stamps for the Jersey Post Office and one for the Royal Mail. He was one of seven leading British illustrators whose work was shown in the exhibition, 'The World of English Picture Books', which toured Japan in 1998. A retrospective exhibition of his work, called 'The Art of Victor Ambrus', was held at the Museum of Somerset, Taunton, in 2016.

Elected
Elected Fellow of the Royal Society of Painter Etchers (R.E. 1973)
Fellow of the Royal Society of Arts 1977 (FRSA)
Elected Member of The Pastel Society (P.S. 1993)
Vice President of The Pastel Society 1995–98 (PPVPS)
2004–2007 Elected the Vice President of the Pastel Society
Hon Fellow, Society of Graphic Fine Art 2010–2021 (Hon SGFA)
He was a Fellow of both the Royal Society of Engravers and the Royal Society of Arts and an Associate of the Royal College of Art, where he earned his degree
Elected Fellow of the Society of Antiquaries of London 2019 (FSA)

Personal life 
In 1958, while at the Royal College, Ambrus married fellow student Glenys R. Chapman. His wife also had a career as an illustrator of children's books. They had two sons, Mark and Sándor.

Ambrus died on 10 February 2021, at the age of 85.

Awards 

 1965 Kate Greenaway Medal for British children's book illustration
 1975 Kate Greenaway Medal
Ambrus twice received the Kate Greenaway Medal from the British Library Association, recognising the year's best children's book illustration by a British subject: the 1965 Medal for The Three Poor Tailors and the 1975 for Mishka and Horses in Battle. All three books were both written and illustrated by Ambrus and published by Oxford. He was also a commended runner up for three Medals: 1963 for both The Royal Navy by Peter Dawlish and A Time of Trial by Hester Burton; 1964 for work in general; and 1971 for The Sultan's Bath, written by himself.
 1993, Daler Rowney Prize
 1993, World Wildlife Fund Prize, Society of Wildlife Artists
 1996, Royal Academy of Arts, Arts Club Drawing Prize

Works

Writing

Illustration
Books Illustrated by Glenys and Victor Ambrus

Books Illustrated by Victor Ambrus

written by Hester Burton

written by Jane Duncan

written by Helen Griffiths

written by Elyne Mitchell

written by K. M. Peyton

written by Rosemary Sutcliff

B Written by other authors

References 

Citations

Further reading

External links

 Association of Archaeological Illustrators and Surveyors
 Victor Ambrus Papers, Special Collections at The University of Southern Mississippi (de Grummond Children's Literature Collection) 
 Somerset Archaeology on Film: The Art of Victor Ambrus
 "Victor Ambrus: A Time Team Tribute" - Time Team's official YouTube, 20 February 2021
 

1935 births
2021 deaths
Alumni of the Royal College of Art
Time Team
Artists from Budapest
Associates of the Royal College of Art
British children's book illustrators
British illustrators
Hungarian children's book illustrators
Hungarian emigrants to the United Kingdom
Hungarian illustrators
Hungarian University of Fine Arts alumni
Kate Greenaway Medal winners
Writers who illustrated their own writing
Place of death missing